Gura Foii is a commune in Dâmbovița County, Muntenia, Romania. It is composed of four villages: Bumbuia, Catanele, Făgetu and Gura Foii.

References

Communes in Dâmbovița County
Localities in Muntenia